Berthold Heinrich Friedrich Wiese (19 December 1859, in Rostock – 3 May 1932, in Halle an der Saale) was a German Romance philologist, who specialized in Italian language and literature.

He studied languages at the University of Berlin, where he was awarded his doctorate in 1883 (doctoral advisor, Adolf Tobler) after a study trip to Italy (1881/82). In 1884/85 he was a gymnasium teacher in Ludwigslust, then taught for many years in Halle an der Saale (1886–1925). In the meantime, he gave lectures at the University of Halle (1889–1925), where in 1914 he received an honorary professorship. In 1903 he became an honorary member of the American Dante Society of Cambridge, Massachusetts.

Selected works 
 , 1883 ("On the language of Brunetto Latini")
 , 1883 (edition of the poems of Leonardo Giustiniani)
 , 1885 ("Nineteen songs by Leonardo Giustiniani according to old prints")
 , 1890 ("An Old Lombard legend of St Margaret")
 , 1898 ("History of Italian literature from its origins to the present day")
 , 1902 ("Commentary on Dante's Divine Comedy")
 , 1904 ("Early Italian primer")
 , 1913 (edition of the Ninfale fiesolano by Giovanni Boccaccio)
 '', 1915 ("Italian phrasebook; pocket dictionary for travel and home")

References 

1859 births
1932 deaths
People from Rostock
Humboldt University of Berlin alumni
Academic staff of the University of Halle
Romance philologists
Linguists from Germany